Mithai may refer to:

 Mithai (confectionery), confectionery of the Indian subcontinent
 Bal Mithai, a brown chocolate-like fudge
 Mithai (film), a 2019 Telugu dark comedy film
 Mithai (Bengali TV series), a 2021 Bengali television series
 Mithai (Hindi TV series), a 2022 Hindi television series